Arnold Henry Kegel  (February 21, 1894 – March 1, 1972) was an American gynecologist who invented the Kegel perineometer (an instrument for measuring the strength of voluntary contractions of the pelvic floor muscles) and Kegel exercises (squeezing of the muscles of the pelvic floor) as non-surgical treatment of urinary incontinence from perineal muscle weakness and/or laxity. Today pelvic floor exercises are widely held as first-line treatment for urinary stress incontinence and any type of female incontinence and female genital prolapse, with evidence supporting its use from systematic reviews of randomized trials in the Cochrane Library amongst others. Kegel first published his ideas in 1948. He was Assistant Professor of Gynecology at the Keck School of Medicine of USC.

References

1894 births
1981 deaths
People from Iowa
American gynecologists
University of Dubuque alumni
Loyola University Chicago alumni
Keck School of Medicine of USC faculty